Indotyphlops loveridgei, or Loveridge's worm snake is a harmless blind snake species endemic to northern India.  No subspecies are currently recognized.

Etymology
The specific name, loveridgei, is in honor of British herpetologist Arthur Loveridge.

Geographic range
It is known only from the type specimen, the type locality for which is uncertain: "probably from North India", and likely from "Ambala or the Kulu Valley".

References

Further reading

 Constable JD. 1940. Reptiles from the Indian Peninsula in the Museum of Comparative Zoology. Bull. Mus. Comp. Zool., Harvard College (Cambridge, Massachusetts) 103 (2): 59-160. (Typhlops loveridgei, new species, pp. 110–111).online

External links
 

loveridgei
Reptiles of India
Reptiles described in 1949